Liolaemus cazianiae is a species of lizard in the family  Liolaemidae. The species is endemic to Argentina.

Etymology
The specific name, cazianiae (feminine, genitive singular), is in honor of Argentinean ecologist Sandra Caziani (1961–2005).

Geographic range
L. cazianiae is found in Salta Province, Argentina.

Habitat

Diet
The diet of L. cazianiae consists of plant material.

Reproduction
L. cazianiae is viviparous.

References

Further reading
Lobo F, Slodki D, Valdecantos S (2010). "Two New Species of Lizards of the Liolaemus montanus Group (Iguania: Liolaemidae) from the Northwestern Uplands of Argentina". Journal of Herpetology 44 (2): 279–293. (Liolaemus cazianiae, new species).
Paz MM, Semhan RV, Abdala CS (2013). "Amplicación del área de distribución de Liolaemus cazianae [sic] (Lobo, Slodky [sic] & Valdecantos, 2010) en la Provincia de Salta (Argentina)". Cuadernos de Herpetología 27 (2): ?. (in Spanish).

cazianiae
Reptiles described in 2010
Reptiles of Argentina
Taxa named by Fernando Lobo